Angus Brendan MacNeil (born 21 July 1970) is the Scottish National Party (SNP) Member of Parliament (MP) for  covering the Outer Hebrides.

Background
MacNeil was educated at Castlebay Secondary School on the island of Barra and the Nicolson Institute in Stornoway on the Isle of Lewis before attending Strathclyde University where he played shinty and in 1992 gained a degree in civil engineering. After graduation he worked as a civil engineer for Morrison Construction and as a student reporter for the Gaelic section of BBC Radio Scotland. After qualifying as a teacher at Jordanhill College in 1996 , he then taught the first Gaelic Medium Class at Salen and Acharacle Primary Schools in Argyll on the Scottish mainland.

Unusually, MacNeil is a Roman Catholic representing a strongly Presbyterian parliamentary constituency.

House of Commons

In March 2006, MacNeil came to attention when he lodged a complaint with the Metropolitan Police regarding the Labour Party Cash for Peerages scandal. In April 2006, he and former "anti-corruption" MP Martin Bell wrote to prime minister, Tony Blair calling for all appointments to the House of Lords to be suspended in the wake of the scandal. In November 2006 he won the Best Scot at Westminster section of the Scottish Politician of the Year awards for instigating the inquiry into possible abuse of the honours system. On 17 November 2006 MacNeil had the highest bill for travel in 2006–07. This is mainly due to the distance of his constituency from London as well as the dispersed geographical nature of the constituency. He also received awards from The Spectator magazine and the Political Studies Society for setting the political agenda in Britain during 2006. He is a member of the editorial board for political monthly Total Politics. MacNeil was re-elected to Parliament in 2010.

He has served on a number of parliamentary committees. In June 2015 he was appointed chair of the Energy and Climate Change Select Committee; in July 2016, chair of the International Trade Select Committee; and in October 2017, a member of the Joint Committee on the National Security Strategy.

Outside Parliament, he has also served as a member of the Advisory Board at Polar Research and Policy Initiative since February 2016.

In July 2019 MacNeil criticised the then Conservative leadership candidate, Boris Johnson for stating that learning English is essential for immigrants. MacNeil called English a "Germanic import" in contrast to indigenous Celtic languages.

Personal life

In 1998 MacNeil married Jane Douglas who worked as his parliamentary secretary.

In 2007, the Sunday Mail reported MacNeil had "kissed and fondled" two girls aged 17 and 18 in an Orkney hotel room while his wife was in hospital pregnant with their third child. MacNeil said he bitterly regretted the incident and said he was angry it had diverted attention from the "substantial political issues" he had been pursuing. In a statement, MacNeil, then 36, apologised for the "embarrassment and hurt" caused to his family by his actions.

In May 2016, MacNeil and his wife announced that they had separated; this followed reports that MacNeil and his colleague Stewart Hosie had both had affairs with Westminster-based journalist Serena Cowdy.

In October 2020, he was involved in a collision with a 17 year old motorcyclist and charged with causing serious injury, to which he pleaded not guilty. His trial was delayed until May 2022 where he was found guilty of dangerous driving and fined £1,500.

MacNeil is a dual British and Irish citizen.

References

External links

 Personal website
 SNP profile
 Guardian articles by Angus MacNeil

Scottish National Party MPs
1970 births
Scottish people of Irish descent
Living people
Members of the Parliament of the United Kingdom for Scottish constituencies
People from Barra
UK MPs 2005–2010
UK MPs 2010–2015
UK MPs 2015–2017
UK MPs 2017–2019
UK MPs 2019–present
Shinty players
People educated at the Nicolson Institute